Digital labor or digital labour represents an emergent forms of labor characterized by the production of value through interaction with information and communication technologies such as digital platforms or artificial intelligence. The examples of digital labor include on-demand platforms, micro-working and user generated data for digital platforms such as social media. Digital labor describes work that encompasses a variety of online tasks. If a country has the structure to maintain a digital economy, digital labor can generate income for individuals without the limitations of physical barriers.

Origins 
As production-based industries declined, the rise of a digital and information-based economy fostered the development of the digital labor market. The rise of digital labor can be attributed to the shift from the Industrial Revolution to the Information Age. Digital labor can be connected to the economic process of disintermediation, where digital labor has taken away the job of the mediator in employee-employer supply chains. The value of the labor produced by marginalized digital workers in the digital or gig economy has yet to be recognized formally through labor laws. In many cases, individuals who work in digital labor are considered to be self employed and are not protected by their employer to fluctuations in the economy.  Based on Marxian economic theory, digital labor can be considered labor as it produces use-value, produces capital, and is based upon collective labor in a workforce.

Digital labor markets are websites or economies which facilitate the production, trade, and selling of digital content, code, digital products, or other ideas or goods emerging from digital and technological environments. A widely used example of a digital labor market is Amazon Mechanical Turk. Other forms of emergent digital subcultures including community forums, blogs, and gamers utilize digital labor as organizing tools. The platforms can be potential generators of cultural goods and are incorporated into global economies and networks.

The popularity of the digital economy can be applied to the onset of economies based on the peer production platform like free and open-source software projects like Linux/GNU and Wikipedia. Computer scientist Jaron Lanier, in the books You are Not a Gadget and Who Owns the Future, argues that the open source approach contributed to the social stratification and widening of the gaps between rich and the poor, the rich being the major stakeholders in digital companies, who own the content of the content creators. A critique of the open source software movement is that peer production economies rely on an increasingly alienated labor force, forced into unpaid, knowledge labor.

On-demand platforms 
On-demand work has been rising since the years 2008-2010. It follows the development of Internet access and the spread of mobile devices, which allow almost everyone to be in touch with this kind of platform, including children and teenagers. Such platforms cover a large field of domains : rental (Airbnb, Booking.com), travel (trivago, tripadvisor), food delivery (Uber Eats, Grub Hub, and Postmates), transportation (Uber, Taxify, Lyft), home services (Task Rabbit, Helpling), education (Udemy, Coursera), etc.

'Workers on such platforms are often not considered as employees, and aren't well paid. For example, an Uber driver earns between $8.80 and $11 per hour after expenses.

All of these platforms can be seen as data producers : both customers and workers produce data while using the service. This data can then be used for improving the service or can be sold on the market. Business model of such companies is often centered around data.

In December of 2020, Saile Inc. filed a United States trademark for Digital Labor™, based on their patent-pending Artificial Intelligence that performs the entire sales prospecting lifecycle by performing digital tasks on behalf of human sales executives.  Digital Labor™ tasks are tracked, counted and purchased from Saile by companies ranging from the Fortune 500 to small businesses.

Social media

The notion of digital labor on social media arise from the fact that most of the value of any social media platforms is created by the users. Therefore they can be considered as digital workers on the platform. On most platforms however this work remains unpaid. Some exceptions include video and music sharing platforms. This is linked with the notion of participatory culture, "a term often used for designating the involvement of users, audiences, consumers and fans in the creation of culture and content".

Digital labor is rooted in Italian autonomist, workerist/Operaismo worker's rights movements of the 1960s and 1970s, as well as the wages for housework movement founded by Selma James in 1972. The idea of the "digital economy" is defined as the moment, where work has shifted from the factory to the social realm. Italian autonomists would describe this as the, "social factory."
Studies of the digital labor of social media were some of the first critiques of digital labor. This included scholarship like, "What the MySpace generation should know about working for free" (Trebor Scholz), and "From Mobile Playgrounds to Sweatshop City" (2010). (Andrew Ross), Tiziana Terranova and others developed a working definition of digital labor, drawing from the idea of free labor, and immaterial labor.

Other scholars who have written about Digital Labor include: Ursula Huws, Trebor Scholz, Frank Pasquale, Sergio Bellucci, Christian Fuchs, Andrew Ross, Jaron Lanier, as well as Postcolonial feminists, including, Lisa Nakamura. Their work has been tied to other Alter-globalization texts.

Social networking labor, or user labor, denotes the creation of data by social media and networking platforms users, which contributes to the financial gains and profits of those platforms, but not to the users. It is based on the production and exchange of cultural content, and the collection of users' metadata. Microwork tasks can be completed before using the platform, which indirectly trains algorithms (such as text or image recognition when creating an account).

Digital labor rights 
The current debate over digital labor examines whether or not society's capitalistic economy has prompted corporate exploitation of digital labor in social media. Social media has developed as a means for people to create and share information and ideas over the Internet. Because social media are typically associated with leisure and entertainment, the monetization of digital labor has blurred the line separating work from entertainment. Proponents argue that exploitation occurs as typical social media users do not receive any monetary compensation for their digital content, while companies are able to take advantage of this freely accessible information to generate revenues. Studies of social media sites such as YouTube have analyzed their business models and found that user-generated digital labor is being monetized through ads and other methods to create company profit. Criticism against exploitation centers around people as prosumers. Scholars argue that exploitation cannot occur if people are both producing and consuming their own digital labor, thereby deriving value from their own created content.

Due to the lack of regulation, the issue of digital labor worker rights has been raised by some activists and scholars. Some scholars have criticized the current situation as a form of neocolonialist exploitation.

Gender Inequality 
Female platform work is more prevalent in countries that have lower female participation rates or in areas in which women tend to be more prevalent in non-standard types of employment and lower-wage jobs. The platform economy provides employment opportunities for disadvantaged groups who lack better options in their area. Platform economies can reproduce inequalities that are present in offline work such as lower earnings and occupational segregation. Women tend to be centered around digital roles that conform to patterns in the traditional labor market and economy such as freelancing and on-location services provided by care work platforms. The participation of women in digital work platforms tends to be more concentered on traditionally female gender rolled tasks. A technical report by the European Commission found that females are less likely to perform creative tasks, micro-tasking, transportation, and software development when compared to men when performing digital labor.

Over the last two decades, there has been a steady decline in the gender-based wage gap in the United Kingdom largely caused by strict national labor relation anti-discrimination legislation. However, there still exist many challenges such as low labor force participation, gender wage gaps, occupational segregation, and a postgraduate educational gap.

In the UK and most of Europe, many women find digital labor employment through remote crowd-work platforms (also known as part of the "Gig-economy") like Upwork, TaskRabbit, etc. The switch from the traditional labor market to platform labor has not extinguished the gender bias in traditional employment but rather bought new sets of challenges. The hiring process used in digital labor platforms are executed by machine learning algorithms which learn from past data patterns and are showing discriminatory outcomes based around gender. An interview conducted with 49 women was carried out to figure out the gender dimensions of these digital platforms and multiple complaints based around gender bias were reported as customer feedback.

The African Union has a vision to empower women through Information and communication technologies (ICTs). They also declared 2010 to 2020 as the African Women's Decade. It is found that there are several gender inequalities due to education, socioeconomic status, domesticity, and traditionalism which creates disparity in the ICT access and usage. It further widens the digital gender divide between men's and women's representation in the digital labor market. Women in Africa were hopeful that new digital technologies or digitized work would bring equal pay and working opportunities, but in reality, they are facing new gender-based inequalities like economic insecurities, high work intensity, and adverse psychological impacts among women workers on such platforms.

See also
 Microwork
 Amazon Mechanical Turk
 Computer and network surveillance
 Hyperreality
 Wages for housework
 Online volunteering

References

Bibliography
 Paolo Virno and Michael Hardt, Radical Thought in Italy: A Potential Politics (Minneapolis: University of Minnesota Press, 1996). 
 Antonio Negri, The Politics of Subversion: A Manifesto for the Twenty-first Century (Cambridge: Polity, 1989). 
 Anonymous, "The Digital Artisan Manifesto." (posted to nettime on 15 May 1997).
Anwar, Mohammad Amir (2022-09-07). "Platforms of inequality: Gender dynamics of digital labour in Africa". Gender and Development. 30 (3): 747–764. doi:10.1080/13552074.2022.2121059
Anwar, M. A., & Graham, M. (2020). Digital labour at economic margins: African workers and the global information economy. Review of African Political Economy, 47(163), 95–105. https://doi.org/10.1080/03056244.2020.1728243
Graham, M. and Anwar, M.A. 2018. "Digital Labour" In: Digital Geographies Ash, J., Kitchin, R. and Leszczynski, A. (eds.). Sage. London.
Gong, J., Hong, Y., & Zentner, A. (2018). Role of Monetary Incentives in the Digital and Physical Inter-Border Labor Flows. Journal of Management Information Systems, 35(3), 866–899. https://doi.org/10.1080/07421222.2018.1481661
Kaplan, M. (2020). The Self-consuming Commodity: Audiences, Users, and the Riddle of Digital Labor. Television & New Media, 21(3), 240–259. https://doi.org/10.1177/152747641881900
Kvasny, L. (2013). Digital labour: the Internet as playground and factory. New Technology, Work & Employment, 28(3), 254–256. https://doi.org/10.1111/ntwe.12019
 Value-Creation in the Late Twentieth Century: The Rise of the Knowledge Worker.  Institute of Governmental Affairs, University of California, Davis. 1995. .
 Political Economy of Information, ed. Vincent Mosco and Janet Wasko (Madison: University of Wisconsin Press, 1988). 
Schmiede, R. (2017). Reconsidering value and labour in the digital age (dynamics of virtual work series). New Technology, Work & Employment, 32(1), 59–61. https://doi.org/10.1111/ntwe.12083
Scholz, T. (2012). Digital Labor. doi:10.4324/9780203145791
 Sergio Bellucci, E-Work. Lavoro,  rete, innovazione, Roma, Derive e Approdi, 2005.
Siegel, B., Hoffman, R., & Skigen, R. (2020). Evolution of Automation in the Department of Defense: Leveraging Digital Labor to Transform Finance and Business Operations. Armed Forces Comptroller, 65(2), 40–44.
Surie, A., & Sharma, L. V. (2019). Climate change, Agrarian distress, and the role of digital labour markets: evidence from Bengaluru, Karnataka. Decision (0304-0941), 46(2), 127–138. https://doi.org/10.1007/s40622-019-00213-w
Verma, T. (2018). Feminism, Labour and Digital Media: The Digital Housewife. Australian Feminist Studies, 33(96), 277. https://doi.org/10.1080/08164649.2018.1517252

External links
 Digital Labor: Sweatshops, picket lines, barricades, the New School November 2014.
 The Internet as Playground and Factory conference, at the New School, 2009
 CUNY Digital Labor Working Group

 
Political theories
Labour economics